Lake Chelan State Park is a public recreation area covering  on the southwest shore of Lake Chelan in Chelan County, Washington, on the east side of the Cascade Mountains. The state park was created with the state's initial purchase of land in 1942; it opened in 1943. The park offers camping, picnicking, hiking, boating, and water activities.

References

External links
Lake Chelan State Park Washington State Parks and Recreation Commission 
Lake Chelan State Park Map Washington State Parks and Recreation Commission

Parks in Chelan County, Washington
State parks of Washington (state)
Protected areas established in 1942